Pannaria aotearoana is a species of lichen in the family Pannariaceae, first described in 2016 by Arve Elvebakk and John Elix from a specimen found on a Coprosma linariifolia in the South Island of New Zealand.

References

Peltigerales
Lichen species
Lichens described in 2016
Taxa named by Arve Elvebakk
Taxa named by John Alan Elix
Lichens of New Zealand